Cicarimanah is a village in Situraja Regional District, Sumedang Regency, West Java Province, Indonesia. The village is located at an altitude of 400 meters above sea level in the region ± 850.35 hectares, and is located west of Pamulihan Village, east of Karedok Village, south of Cilopang Village, and north of Bugel Village.

Administration
Administratively, Cicarimanah is one of 15 villages in the Regional District of Situraja of Sumedang Regency, which is located 6 km northeast of Situradja Regional District.

Climate and geography
The mean temperature in Cicarimanah village is 30 °C, and, similar to many villages in Indonesia, experiences a dry and rainy season. The terrain is generally hilly.

History
Cicarimanah was formed around 1982, originally administered as part of Bugel village in the District of Tomo. The town was first led by a society figure and village native named Mr. Omo Rumaja, who served two terms from 1984–2002. After these office holders resigned, the village was led by Mr. Yayat Ruhiyat, also a village native, who also served two terms from 2002–2013. He was succeeded by Mr. Ruhatma, who served when Cicarimanah became part of the Regional District of Situraja on 1 January 2014.

Village leadership is detailed in the table below:

References

Cicarimanah